Lowell High School, or LHS is a four-year public high school located in Lowell, Indiana. Lowell is a part of the Tri-Creek School Corporation.

Athletics
The official mascot of Lowell Senior High School is the Red Devil.

Lowell High School offers the following sports:
Men's baseball
Men and women's basketball
Women's cheerleading
Men and women's cross country
Men's football
Men's and women's golf
Women's gymnastics
Men's and women's soccer
Women's softball
Men and women's swimming and diving
Men's and women's tennis
Men and women's track and field
Women's volleyball
Men's wrestling

Crown Point High School and Lowell High School 
A notable rivalry has existed primarily between the football teams from Crown Point High School and Lowell High School since approximately 1903. Each team competes for "The Old Leather Helmet Trophy", a piece of World War I era leather headgear that is mounted to a wooden platform. This trophy symbolizes the long history of the schools rivalry on the football field, though the rivalry extends into other athletic arenas. Crown Point High School and Lowell High School are not in the same athletic conference, they choose to compete once during the football season to continue the long competitive history.

Fine arts
Lowell High School offers the following fine arts programs:
Theatre
Marching band (Lowell Marching Red Devils)
Jazz Band
Wind Ensemble
Pep Band
Winter Guard
Winter Drumline
Show choir (Vocal Flare)

Notable alumni
 Corbett Davis - NFL player and first overall draft pick.
 Jo Anne Worley - original Laugh-in cast member (1968-1970)

See also
 List of high schools in Indiana

References

External links 
Official webpage
History of Lowell High School
Tri-Creek School Corporation

Public high schools in Indiana
Educational institutions established in 1892
Schools in Lake County, Indiana
1892 establishments in Indiana